Amos Smith Booth (September 4, 1848 – July 1, 1921), nicknamed "Darling", was a professional baseball player in the 1870s and 1880s. Booth's primary playing years were in 1876 and 1877 with the Cincinnati Reds. He had a .261 batting average his first year, and a .171 in 1877. Booth took a leave of absence from baseball until 1880 when he appeared in one game with his old team. He also played in 2 games in 1882, with the Baltimore Orioles and Louisville Eclipse.

Sources

Cincinnati Reds (1876–1879) players
Baltimore Orioles (AA) players
Louisville Eclipse players
19th-century baseball players
Baseball players from Ohio
Major League Baseball catchers
Major League Baseball shortstops
Major League Baseball third basemen
People from Lebanon, Ohio
1848 births
1921 deaths
Minor league baseball managers
Lowell (minor league baseball) players
Washington Nationals (minor league) players
Hamilton (minor league baseball) players